Under Fire, also known as Dark Valor, is a 1957 American drama film directed by James B. Clark, written by James Landis, and starring Rex Reason, Harry Morgan, Steve Brodie, Peter Walker, Robert Levin and Jon Locke. It was released on September 23, 1957, by 20th Century Fox.

The film was produced by Plato A. Skouras, son of 20th Century Fox chairman Spyros Skouras.

Plot

Cast 
Rex Reason as Lt. Steve Rogerson
Harry Morgan as Sgt. Joseph C. Dusak 
Steve Brodie as Capt. Linn
Peter Walker as Lt. Sarris
Robert Levin as Pvt. Pope
Jon Locke as Corp. John Crocker
Gregory LaFayette as Cpl. Quinn
Karl Lukas as Sgt. Hutchins
William Allyn as Lt. Karl Stagg
Frank Gerstle as Col. Dundee
Tom McKee as Capt. O'Mar
George Chakiris as Pvt. Steiner

Production
Filming started in June 1957. The same team later made Sierra Baron, and Villa!!

References

External links 
 

1957 films
1950s war drama films
20th Century Fox films
CinemaScope films
American war drama films
1957 directorial debut films
Films directed by James B. Clark
Films scored by Paul Dunlap
Military courtroom films
Western Front of World War II films
1957 drama films
1950s English-language films
1950s American films